Neotsu is an unincorporated community in Lincoln County, Oregon, United States, on the northern shore of Devils Lake across from Lincoln City. Neotsu has a post office with ZIP code 97364. The community is on the 45th parallel north.

State representative David Gomberg is from Neotsu.

Demographics

References

External links
 Historic images of 45th parallel sign in Neotsu from Salem Public Library

Unincorporated communities in Lincoln County, Oregon
Unincorporated communities in Oregon